17163 Vasifedoseev, provisional designation , is a stony Koronian asteroid from the outer region of the asteroid belt, approximately 4 kilometers in diameter.

The asteroid was discovered on 9 June 1999, by the Lincoln Near-Earth Asteroid Research team at Lincoln Laboratory's ETS in Socorro, New Mexico, United States. It was named for Vasiliy Fedoseev, an awardee of the ISEF contest in 2003.

Orbit and classification 

Vasifedoseev is a member of the Koronis family, a family of  stony asteroids in the outer main-belt. It orbits the Sun at a distance of 2.7–3.1 AU once every 4 years and 11 months (1,807 days). Its orbit has an eccentricity of 0.08 and an inclination of 1° with respect to the ecliptic. The first precovery was obtained at ESO's La Silla Observatory in 1990, extending the asteroid's observation arc by 9 years prior to its discovery.

Physical characteristics

Rotation period 

A rotational lightcurve of Vasifedoseev was obtained from photometric observations by the wide-field survey at the Palomar Transient Factory in September 2010. Lightcurve analysis gave a rotation period of  hours with a brightness variation of 0.23 magnitude.

Diameter and albedo 

According to the survey carried out by the NEOWISE mission of NASA's space-based Wide-field Infrared Survey Explorer, Vasifedoseev measures 4.9 kilometers in diameter and its surface has an albedo of 0.17, while the Collaborative Asteroid Lightcurve Link assumes an albedo of 0.24 and calculates a diameter of 3.7 kilometers with an absolute magnitude of 14.34.

Naming 

This minor planet was named after Russian Vasiliy G. Fedoseev (born 1986) an awardee of the Intel International Science and Engineering Fair (ISEF) in 2003. At the time, he attended the Lyceum of Information Technologies Moscow, Russia. The official naming citation was published by the Minor Planet Center on 14 June 2004.

References

External links 
 Asteroid Lightcurve Database (LCDB), query form (info )
 Dictionary of Minor Planet Names, Google books
 Asteroids and comets rotation curves, CdR – Observatoire de Genève, Raoul Behrend
 Discovery Circumstances: Numbered Minor Planets (15001)-(20000) – Minor Planet Center
 
 

017163
017163
Named minor planets
19990609